Markus Poom (born 27 February 1999) is an Estonian professional footballer who plays as a midfielder for League of Ireland Premier Division club Shamrock Rovers, on loan from Flora, and the Estonia national team.

Club career 

On 16 January 2023, Poom joined Irish club Shamrock Rovers on loan for the entirety of the 2023 season.

International career
Poom made his senior international debut for Estonia on 11 January 2019, coming on as a half-time substitute for Brent Lepistu in a 2–1 friendly win over Finland.

Personal life
Poom was born in Derby, England. He is the son of former Estonia international goalkeeper, Mart Poom.

Honours

Club
Flora
Meistriliiga: 2017, 2019, 2020, 2022
Estonian Cup: 2019–20

References

External links

1999 births
Living people
Footballers from Derby
Estonian footballers
Association football midfielders
Esiliiga players
Meistriliiga players
FC Flora players
Shamrock Rovers F.C. players
Estonia youth international footballers
Estonia under-21 international footballers
Estonia international footballers
Estonian expatriate footballers
Expatriate sportspeople in Ireland
Estonian expatriate sportspeople in Ireland
FC Nõmme United players